The Journal of Substance Abuse Treatment is a peer-reviewed medical journal covering research on substance abuse and drug addiction, and the treatment of such disorders. It was established in 1984 and is currently published monthly by Elsevier. The editor-in-chief is Hannah K. Knudsen (University of Kentucky). According to the Journal Citation Reports, the journal has a 2021 impact factor of 3.917.

References

External links

Elsevier academic journals
Publications established in 1984
English-language journals
Addiction medicine journals
8 times per year journals